BCR may refer to:

Companies
Brockmore Classic Replicas, British manufacturer

Organisations
Banca Comercială Română, a Romanian Commercial Bank
Banque Commerciale du Rwanda, former name of the Commercial Bank of Rwanda
Belarusian Central Rada, a puppet government of Belarus under German occupation during World War II
The British Columbia Regiment (Duke of Connaught's Own)
Bibliographical Center for Research
Community Bureau of Reference, a committee of the European Commission to standardize measurements

Transport
Brent Cross Railway, former name of North and West London Light railway
British Columbia Railway, former name of BC Rail
Beijing Suburban Railway also known as Beijing City Rail (BCR)

Radio
Belfast Community Radio, a radio station that broadcast in Belfast, Northern Ireland which relaunched as Belfast CityBeat in 1996
107.4 BCR FM, a radio station based in Bridgwater, Somerset, England which relaunched as Quay West 107.4
Big City Radio, a radio station based in Birmingham, England

Science and Technology
B-cell receptor, a transmembrane receptor protein
Base curve radius, a parameter of a contact lens
BCR (gene), the breakpoint cluster region protein
Biochemical recurrence, for example in prostate cancer
Barcode recognition, a form of automatic identification and data capture.

Other
Ball closure ring, a form of body piercing jewelry
Bay City Rollers, a Scottish pop rock band of the 1970s
Benefit–cost ratio, in  cost-benefit analysis
Binding corporate rules, a means of authorizing transfers of personal data
Bionic Commando Rearmed, a downloadable video game by Capcom
Black Country Rangers F.C., an English non-league football team
Brick City Rock, one of the many martial arts related to jailhouse rock
Brussels-Capital Region, a region of Belgium comprising 19 municipalities, including the City of Brussels
Bâtiment de commandement et ravitailleur, Durance-class command and replenishment oilers
Bottle Change Rider Series, a toy line series of Kamen Rider Build action figures